Yellabinna may refer to:

Yellabinna (biogeographic subregion), a sub-region of the Great Victoria Desert - refer Interim Biogeographic Regionalisation for Australia#G
Yellabinna Regional Reserve, a protected area in South Australia
Yellabinna Wilderness Protection Area, a protected area in South Australia
Yellabinna, South Australia, a locality